The Willow River is a river of Minnesota. It rises in St. Louis County near Gheen and flows into the Little Fork River in Class County, near Silverdale. Willow River is part of the Hudson Bay drainage basin.

See also
List of rivers of Minnesota

References 

Minnesota watersheds
USGS Hydrologic Unit Map - State of Minnesota (1974)

Rivers of Minnesota